This is the list with awards and nominations received by the American sitcom The Jeffersons (1975–1985).

By award

Emmy Awards
1979: Outstanding Actress - Comedy Series (Isabel Sanford, for playing "Louise Jefferson" nominated)
1980: Outstanding Actress - Comedy Series (Sanford, nominated)
1981: Outstanding Actress - Comedy Series (Sanford, won)
1981: Outstanding Supporting Actress - Comedy, Variety or Music Series (Marla Gibbs for playing "Florence Johnston", nominated)
1982: Outstanding Actress - Comedy Series (Sanford, nominated)
1982: Outstanding Supporting Actress - Comedy, Variety or Music Series (Gibbs, nominated)
1983: Outstanding Actress - Comedy Series (Sanford, nominated)
1983: Outstanding Supporting Actress - Comedy, Variety or Music Series (Gibbs, nominated)
1983: Outstanding Video Tape Editing for a Series (for "Change of a Dollar", won)
1984: Outstanding Actor - Comedy Series (Sherman Hemsley for playing "George Jefferson", nominated)
1984: Outstanding Actress - Comedy Series (Sanford, nominated)
1984: Outstanding Supporting Actress - Comedy Series (Gibbs, nominated)
1985: Outstanding Actress - Comedy Series (Sanford, nominated)
1985: Outstanding Supporting Actress - Comedy Series (Gibbs, nominated)
Source

Golden Globe Awards
1976: Best Actress - Musical or Comedy Series (Isabel Sanford for playing "Louise Jefferson", nominated)
1977: Best Actress - Musical or Comedy Series (Sanford, nominated)
1982: Best Actress - Musical or Comedy Series (Sanford, nominated)
1983: Best Actress - Musical or Comedy Series (Sanford, nominated)
1984: Best Actor - Musical or Comedy Series (Sherman Hemsley for playing "George Jefferson", nominated)
1984: Best Actress - Musical or Comedy Series (Sanford, nominated)
1984: Best Series - Musical or Comedy (nominated)
1984: Best Supporting Actress - (Mini)Series or TV Film (Marla Gibbs for playing "Florence Johnston", nominated)
Source

Image Awards
1981: Best Actor - Comedy Series or Special (Sherman Hemsley for playing "George Jefferson", nominated)
1981: Best Actress - Comedy Series or Special (Marla Gibbs for playing "Florence Johnston", nominated)
Source

Young Artist Awards
1985: Best Young Actor - Guest in a TV Series (Jaleel White for playing "Van Van Morris", nominated)

References

Awards
Lists of awards by television series